Cottekill is a small hamlet in the northwest part of the Town of Rosendale, Ulster County, New York,  United States.  Located in the Rondout Valley, it is approximately 2.25 miles east of the hamlet of Stone Ridge, 2.5 miles northwest of Rosendale Village, 8.75 miles south of the city of Kingston and 10.9 miles north of the village of New Paltz. As of 2014, the population was listed at 451.

Institutions and points of interest
Cottekill features a Post Office (12419) and has its own fire department, Cottekill Volunteer Fire Company. The Brookside School, a private school for children with developmental disabilities is located here as well as the Sustainable Living Resource Center, a project of Sustainable Hudson Valley. SUNY Ulster, a community college, is nearby in Stone Ridge. 

There is also the Marbletown-Rosendale Rail Trail, curving along the old New York, Ontario and Western Railway (O&W) tracks, paralleling Lucas Avenue. It starts at Leggett Road, crosses the Cottekill Creek on a wooden footbridge and travels north to Cottekill Road, past the Cottekill Fire House. It continues north from the firehouse, along the O&W path, crosses Marcott Road and comes out on Route 209.

Demographics
Median Age: 44.9 years
Average Income: $49,737

Climate

January Avg Temp: 22 °F
July Avg Temp:    72 °F 
Rainfall Avg (inches): 45 
Snowfall Avg (inches): 42

Notable people 

 Steve Hamilton - Detective novelist
 Marja Vallila (sculptor)

Relevant links
Cottekill.com
CottekillFire.org

Hamlets in New York (state)
Hamlets in Ulster County, New York
Rosendale, New York